Bank of China Building may refer to:
Bank of China Building, Shanghai
Bank of China Building (Hong Kong)
Bank of China Building, Macau
Bank of China Building, Singapore

See also
Bank of China Tower (disambiguation)